A Change of Heart is a studio album by David Sanborn, released in 1987 through the record label Warner Bros. The album reached number 74 on the Billboard 200, number 43 on Billboard's R&B Albums chart and number 3 on the Top Contemporary Jazz Albums chart.

Track listing

Personnel

Musicians

 David Sanborn – alto saxophone
 Marcus Miller – keyboards (1, 2), rhythm guitar (1), bass (1-3, 5, 6), synthesizer arrangements (2)
 Jason Miles – synthesizer programming (1, 2)
 Bernard Wright – additional synthesizers (1)
 Don Grolnick – electric piano (2)
 Rob Mounsey – additional synthesizers (2), synthesizer arrangements (2)
 Michael Colina – synthesizers (3, 5, 6), programming (3, 5, 6), arrangements (3, 5, 6)
 John Mahoney – Synclavier (3, 5, 6)
 Mac Rebennack – acoustic piano (3)
 Philippe Saisse – keyboards (4), synthesizers (4), programming (4), synth guitar lead (4), arrangements (4)
 Ronnie Foster – synthesizers (7), programming (7), arrangements (7)
 Michael Sembello – synthesizers (8), programming (8), arrangements (8), backing vocals (8)
 Randy Waldman – additional keyboards (8)
 Casey Young – Synclavier programming (8)
 Hiram Bullock – lead guitar (1, 7), rhythm guitar (5), electric guitar solo (5)
 Hugh McCracken – rhythm guitar (3), slide guitar solo (3)
 Nick Moroch – electric guitar (4, 6), guitar solo (4)
  Carlos Rios – electric guitar (7), acoustic guitar (7)
 Anthony Jackson – contrabass guitar (4)
 Steve Ferrone – drums (1)
 Steve Gadd – drums (2)
 Mino Cinelu – electronic drum fills (3, 5), percussion (3, 5, 6)
 Mickey Curry – drums (4)
 John Robinson – drums (7)
 Paulinho da Costa – percussion (7)
 Michael Brecker – EWI controller (6)
 Mark Stevens – backing vocals (1)

Production

 Marcus Miller – producer (1, 2), engineer (2)
 Michael Colina – producer (3, 5, 6, 8), executive producer 
 Philippe Saisse – producer (4)
 Ronnie Foster – producer (7)
 Michael Hutchinson – engineer (1)
 Marti Robertson – engineer (1, 2)
 Eric Calvi – engineer (3-7)
 Billy C. Haarbauer – MIDI engineer (4)
 Keith Seppanen – engineer (7)
 Hilary Bercovici – engineer (8)
 Paul Hamingson – assistant engineer
 Acar Key – assistant engineer
 Mike Krowiak – assistant engineer
 Jeff Lippay – assistant engineer
 Moira Marquis – assistant engineer
 Gary Rindfuss – assistant engineer
 Bud Rizzo – assistant engineer
 Mario Rodriguez – assistant engineer
 Dary Sulich – assistant engineer
 Josh Abbey – mixing (1-3, 5, 7, 8)
 The French Acrobats – mixing (4)
 Larry Alexander – mixing (6)
 George Marino – mastering at Sterling Sound (New York, New York).
 Bibi Green – production coordinator
 Shirley Klein – album coordinator 
 Michael Hodgson – art direction, design 
 Ann Field – illustration
 Guido Harari – photography 
 Patrick Rains & Associates – management

References

1987 albums
David Sanborn albums
Albums produced by Michael Colina
Albums produced by Marcus Miller
Warner Records albums